Thadal is a cooling and energizing drink, used by the pehlwan of the Sindh province in Pakistan. The drink keep the wrestlers liver cool during fights and exercises. The drink is prepared using ground char magaz, dry fruits, pepper and almonds.

The refresher is said to be so cooling that it can give you a cold, so a pinch of black pepper is added.

Recipe

Ingredients:
 1.5 liter Water
 300 g Sugar
 250 ml Milk 
 20 pc of Almonds [Badam]
 Seeds of Tarbooz [watermelon] 1 tspn
 Kharbooza [Cantaloupes] 1 tspn
 1/2 Table Spoon of Saunf [Fennel]
 1/2 Spoon Ilaychi Powder [cardamom]
 1/2 Spoon Khashkhas [poppy seeds]
 10 Kali Mirch [black pepper]
 50 g Gulqand Gulkand or 20 dried/fresh Rose Petals 

Method:
Soak the sugar in about 0.5 liters of water. 
Clean all the ingredients & soak them in 400 ml. of water. 
Keep the mixture for 2–3 hours. 
Grind the soaked ingredients for getting a paste. 
Add the remaining water and put under strong stir. 
Filter the liquid, add sugar solution, milk and rose water. 
Mix well. 
Get chilled before serving, can add ice for the purpose.

See also
Pehlwani
Wrestling
Pehlivan

References

Non-alcoholic drinks